Hot Jamz was a Hip-Hop, Urban Contemporary and R&B music Channel on Sirius Satellite Radio channel 50 and Dish Network channel 6050.  On February 2008, Sirius Canada dropped the channel, but it was reintroduced in June 2008.

On November 12, 2008, Hot Jamz was eliminated from the Sirius lineup and replaced by XM's Channel devoted to Rhythmic Contemporary music, The Heat as part of the restructuring by Sirius XM Radio.  The Heat also flipped from rhythmic top 40 to urban contemporary by that time, but later reverted to rhythmic when Pop2K converted to an online-only channel for the Sirius service on January 15, 2009.

The station's playlist was part of the weekly research for the Billboard Hot R&B/Hip-Hop Airplay chart.

See also
 List of Sirius Satellite Radio stations

References 

Sirius Satellite Radio channels
Defunct radio stations in the United States
Radio stations established in 2002
Radio stations disestablished in 2008